The initialism NDPS may stand for:

 Narcotic Drugs and Psychotropic Substances Act (disambiguation) - law in various jurisdictions
  Novell Distributed Print Services, a component of Novell NetWare
NEW DIGAMBER PUBLIC SCHOOL-a school
Notre Dame Public School-a school